A Light in the Window (Spanish: Una luz en la ventana) is a 1942 Argentine horror thriller film directed by Manuel Romero and starring Narciso Ibáñez Menta, Irma Córdoba and Juan Carlos Thorry. It is considered to be the first Argentine horror movie.

Plot 
Angélica, a young nurse (Irma Córdoba) is hired by an elderly woman (María Ester Buschiazzo) to care for her in an isolated and mysterious house in the countryside. Unknown to her, Angélica will be the victim of the nefarious plot of an acromegalic doctor (Narciso Ibáñez Menta), a sinister colleague (Nicolás Fregues) and their henchmen. A landowner (Juan Carlos Thorry) and his funny servant (Severo Fernández) become involved by accident and go to the rescue.

Cast
 Narciso Ibáñez Menta as Dr. Herman
 Irma Córdoba as Angélica
 Juan Carlos Thorry as Mario
 Severo Fernández as Juan
 Nicolás Fregues as Dr. Roberts
 María Esther Buschiazzo as Mrs. Herman
 Pedro Pompillo as The Dumb
 Aníbal Segovia as Railway watchman
 Gerardo Rodríguez as Police officer
 Fernando Campos as Police sergeant

References

Bibliography 
 Rist, Peter H. (2014) Historical Dictionary of South American Cinema. Rowman & Littlefield.

External links 
 

1942 films
1940s horror thriller films
1940s Spanish-language films
Films directed by Manuel Romero
Argentine black-and-white films
Argentine horror thriller films
1940s Argentine films